Powell Butte is an unincorporated community in Crook County, Oregon, United States, and named after the nearby Powell Buttes. It is on Oregon Route 126 west of Prineville and east of Redmond. Powell Butte post office was established in 1909.

Climate
This region experiences warm (but not hot) and dry summers, with no average monthly temperatures above .  According to the Köppen Climate Classification system, Powell Butte has a warm-summer Mediterranean climate, abbreviated "Csb" on climate maps.

Notable people
 Marcus Borg, academic, author, theologian
 Mike McLane, judge and former state representative
 David Rufkahr, actor, played the role of Frank Bartles in Bartles and Jaymes wine cooler ads
 John Powell, B:26 July 1818 Claiborne County, Tennessee, United States of America D:3 March 1891 Prineville, Crook County, Oregon, United States of America Farmer, Powell Butte, Oregon named after him

References

1909 establishments in Oregon
Populated places established in 1909
Unincorporated communities in Crook County, Oregon
Unincorporated communities in Oregon